The 2017 Judo Grand Prix Tbilisi was held at the Olympic Palace in Tbilisi, Georgia, from 31 March to 2 April 2017.

Medal summary

Men's events

Women's events

Source Results

Medal table

References

External links
 

2017 IJF World Tour
2017 Judo Grand Prix
Judo
Grand Prix 2017
Judo